Christine Bottomley (born 27 April 1979) is an English actress. She is best known for her roles as Zoey Wyatt in Shameless, Melanie in Early Doors, Susie Ward in Heartbeat and Kirsty in Eastenders.

Early life
Born in Rochdale and grew up in an apartment above the family's chemist shop. She went to several local youth drama groups before embarking on a course at the Royal Scottish Academy of Music and Drama, from where she graduated in 2001.

Career

Following graduation, she made her on-screen debut in an episode of EastEnders. Bottomley has had numerous parts on television, including episodes of the second series of Torchwood, the comedy series Massive and the drama series Hope Springs and Land Girls. Her first film role was in Hush, in 2009. The following year she was nominated for Best New Actress at the London Film Critic's Circle Awards for her portrayal of Lisa Thompson in The Arbor. She is a three-times winner of Best Actress at the BBC Audio Drama Awards; in 2014 for My Boy; 2017 for The Sky is Wider and 2018 for Solitary.

Filmography

Film

Television

Radio

Theatre credits

Awards

References

External links

Christine Bottomley at the British Film Institute

English television actresses
Living people
1979 births
Actors from Rochdale
Alumni of the Royal Conservatoire of Scotland
Actresses from Greater Manchester
English film actresses
English radio actresses
21st-century English actresses
People educated at Bramhall High School